Karaagash is a rural locality (a settlement) in Akhmatovsky Selsoviet, Narimanovsky District, Astrakhan Oblast, Russia. The population was 239 as of 2010. There are 10 streets.

Geography 
It is located on the Volga River, 66 km south of Narimanov (the district's administrative centre) by road. Tinaki 2-ye is the nearest rural locality.

References 

Rural localities in Narimanovsky District